The 1998 Generali Open was a men's tennis tournament played on Clay in Kitzbühel, Austria that was part of the International Series of the 1998 ATP Tour. It was the forty-third edition of the tournament and was held from 27 July – 2 August 1998.

Seeds
Champion seeds are indicated in bold text while text in italics indicates the round in which those seeds were eliminated.

Draw

Finals

Top half

Section 1

Section 2

Bottom half

Section 3

Section 4

References

Singles
Austrian Open Kitzbühel